Lukou may refer to the following locations in China:

District
 Lukou District (渌口区), Hunan

Towns
 Lukou, Yingshang County (鲁口镇), Anhui
 Lukou, Zhuzhou (渌口镇), Hunan

Written as "路口镇":
 Lukou, Chongyang County, in Chongyang County, Hubei
 Lukou, Huangzhou District, in Huanggang, Hubei
 Lukou, Changsha County, Hunan
 Lukou, Yueyang, in Yunxi District, Yueyang, Hunan
 Lukou, Lianhua County, in Lianhua County, Jiangxi

Townships (路口乡)
 Lukou Township, Xi County, Henan
 Lukou Township, Xiushui County, in Xiushui County, Jiangxi